is a private university in Tōkai, Aichi, Japan. The university opened in April 2002 but the predecessor of the school, Ishida Education Group, was founded in 1941.

External links
 Official website

Tōkai, Aichi
Educational institutions established in 1941
Private universities and colleges in Japan
Universities and colleges in Aichi Prefecture
1941 establishments in Japan